Gashnuiyeh-ye Pain (also Romanized as Gashnū’īyeh-ye Pā’īn and Goshnū’īyeh-ye Pā’īn; also known as Gashnoo’eyeh, Gashnū’īyeh, and Gūshnūyeh-ye Pā’īn) is a village in Dar Agah Rural District, in the Central District of Hajjiabad County, Hormozgan Province, Iran. At the 2006 census, its population was 14, in 4 families.

References 

Populated places in Hajjiabad County